Ashoqeh (also Romanized as ‘Āshoqeh, ‘Āsheqeh, and Ashqeh; also known as Ashegheh) is a village in Hamzehlu Rural District, in the Central District of Khomeyn County, Markazi Province, Iran. At the 2006 census, its population was 69, in 19 families.

References 

Populated places in Khomeyn County